This is a list of accidents and incidents involving the Douglas DC-3 that occurred in the early to mid 1970s, including aircraft based on the DC-3 airframe such as the Douglas C-47 Skytrain and Lisunov Li-2. Military accidents are included; and hijackings and incidents of terrorism are covered, although acts of war involving military aircraft are outside the scope of this list.

1970–1971

1972–1973

1974

Notes

References

 1970-1974
20th-century aviation accidents and incidents
1970s-related lists